Inglewood may refer to:

Places

Australia
Inglewood, Queensland
Shire of Inglewood, Queensland, a former local government area
Inglewood, South Australia
Inglewood, Victoria
Inglewood, Western Australia

Canada
Inglewood, Ontario
Inglewood, Calgary
Inglewood, Edmonton

New Zealand
Inglewood, New Zealand

South Africa
 Inglewood, Eastern Cape

United Kingdom
Inglewood, Cheshire, a house
Inglewood Forest, Cumberland
Inglewood Children's Home In Otley

United States
Inglewood, California
Inglewood, Nebraska
Inglewood, Mecklenburg County, Virginia
Inglewood, Rockingham County, Virginia
Inglewood (Glasgow, Missouri), a historic house
Inglewood (Harrisonburg, Virginia), a historic house
Inglewood-Finn Hill, Washington, a census-designated place (CDP) in King County, Washington

Ireland
 Inglewood (Dublin), a housing estate.

People
 Baron Inglewood

See also
 Englewood (disambiguation)